Major-General Henry Richardson Peck  (17 October 1874 – 3 June 1965) was a British Army officer.

Military career
Peck was commissioned into the Royal Artillery on 15 March 1895. He served in the Gallipoli campaign in the First World War for which he was appointed a Companion of the Order of St Michael and St George. He went on to be Commander, Royal Artillery for 2nd Infantry Division in December 1923 and then General Officer Commanding 44th (Home Counties) Division in January 1929 before retiring in January 1933.

References

1874 births
1965 deaths
British Army personnel of World War I
Military personnel from Somerset
British Army major generals
Companions of the Order of the Bath
Companions of the Order of St Michael and St George
Companions of the Distinguished Service Order
Royal Artillery officers